Wife Wanted is a 1946 American crime film directed by Phil Karlson, and starring Kay Francis, Paul Cavanagh, and Robert Shayne. The film's screenplay was written by Caryl Coleman and Sidney Sutherland, based on the novel Wife Wanted by Robert E. Callahan.

Premise
Carole Raymond (Francis) is a film star whose best years are behind her; so, she decides to buy in a real estate plan with Jeff Caldwell (Cavanagh), who is really running an illegitimate matrimonial service.

Cast
 Kay Francis as Carole Raymond
 Paul Cavanagh as Jeffrey Caldwell
 Robert Shayne as Bill Tyler
 Veda Ann Borg as Nola Reed
 Teala Loring as Mildred Kayes
 Jonathan Hale as Philip Conway
 Tim Ryan as Bartender
 Barton Yarborough as Walter Desmond

Production
Kay Francis was unhappy with the first script; so, she and director Phil Karlson set about obtaining a re-write, and became a producer on the film.

The production period was from mid-June to early July 1946.

References

External links

 
 
 
 

1946 films
1946 crime drama films
American black-and-white films
American crime drama films
1940s English-language films
Monogram Pictures films
Films directed by Phil Karlson
1940s American films